Valias Agricultural Cooperative ( – Sherḵat-e Tʿāūnī Kehāvarzī Dāmparūrī Valīʿaṣ) is an agricultural cooperative and village in Shusef Rural District, Shusef District, Nehbandan County, South Khorasan Province, Iran. At the 2006 census, its population was 62, in 15 families.

References 

Populated places in Nehbandan County